Saeed Jassim may refer to:
 Saeed Jassim (footballer, born 1998)
 Saeed Jassim (footballer, born 1995)